Elbow Lake Creek is a stream in Thurston County in the U.S. state of Washington. It is a tributary to the Nisqually River.

Elbow Lake Creek heads at Elbow Lake, from which it takes its name. A variant name is "Elbow Creek".

References

Rivers of Thurston County, Washington